Tolona is an unincorporated community in Lewis County, in the U.S. state of Missouri.

History
Tolona was founded in 1872, and named by postal officials. A post office called Tolona was established in 1872, and remained in operation until 1938. An old variant name was "Blue Grass".

References

Unincorporated communities in Lewis County, Missouri
Unincorporated communities in Missouri